The Inlay-class offshore patrol vessel is a class of offshore patrol vessel (OPV) operated by the Myanmar Navy.The lead ship of the class is UMS Inlay. UMS Inlay was built at Thanlyin Naval Dockyard near Yangon with the help of technical assistance and equipment provided by Singapore-based companies. Launched by late November 2015, Inlay had been very largely completed by April 2017.

Design
It is powered by two diesel engines driving two propellers. The OPV is capable of operating a helicopter from its approximately -long flight deck and has a single hangar. A stern ramp is fitted for a rigid-hulled inflatable boat. The armament comprises manually operated  twin guns in a Type 66 or 76 gun mount on the forecastle as well as two manually-operated heavy machine guns atop the hangar deck. Sensors include two Furuno navigation radars. 

The Inlay will supplement the two remaining Danish-built Osprey-class OPVs in service.

Ships of the class

See also

References

Patrol vessels of Myanmar
Ship classes built by Myanmar Navy